Italy competed at the 1970 Summer Universiade in Turin, Italy and won 14 medals.

Medals

Details

References

External links
 Universiade (World University Games)
 WORLD STUDENT GAMES (UNIVERSIADE - MEN)
 WORLD STUDENT GAMES (UNIVERSIADE - WOMEN)

1970
1970 in Italian sport
Italy